This is a list of calculators created and produced in Soviet Union.

Mechanical computers 
 Odhner Arithmometer
 VK-1

Electromechanical computers 
 Bystritsa
 Bystritsa-2
 Bystritsa-3
 SDV-107
 VK-2
 VK-3
 VMM-2
 VMP-2

Relay calculators 
 Vilnyus
 Vyatka

Electrical calculators 
 Contact-N, Kleyster-N, Spika
 EDVM
 Orbita
 Rasa
 Ros
 Vega

"Elka" series, Bulgaria 
 Elka 22
 Elka 43
 Elka 50M
 Elka 55
 Soemtron 220

"Iskra" series 
 Iskra 108/108D
 Iskra 11
 Iskra 110
 Iskra 1103
 Iskra 111/111I/111M/111T
 Iskra 112/112L
 Iskra 1121
 Iskra 1122
 Iskra 114
 Iskra 12
 Iskra 121
 Iskra 122/122-1
 Iskra 123
 Iskra 124
 Iskra 125
 Iskra 12M
 Iskra 13
 Iskra 210
 Iskra 22
 Iskra 2210
 Iskra 2240/2240M

"Elektronika" series 
 Elektronika 24-71
 Elektronika 4-71/4-71B/4-71C
 Elektronika 4-73B
 Elektronika 68
 Elektronika C2
 Elektronika EKVM D3
 Elektronika EKVM-P
 Elektronika Epos-73A
 Elektronika T3-16
 Elektronika-70

"Elektronika B3" series 
"B" in "B3" stands for "bytovaya" (Russian: бытовая), which means "domestic".
 Elektronika B3-01
 Elektronika B3-02
 Elektronika B3-04
 Elektronika B3-05/B3-05M
 Elektronika B3-08
 Elektronika B3-09/B3-09M
 Elektronika B3-10
 Elektronika B3-11
 Elektronika B3-14/B3-14K
 Elektronika B3-14M
 Elektronika B3-18/B3-18A/B3-18M
 Elektronika B3-19/B3-19M
 Elektronika B3-21
 Elektronika B3-23/B3-23A
 Elektronika B3-24/B3-24G
 Elektronika B3-25/B3-25A
 Elektronika B3-26/B3-26A
 Elektronika B3-30
 Elektronika B3-32
 Elektronika B3-34
 Elektronika B3-35
 Elektronika B3-36
 Elektronika B3-37
 Elektronika B3-38
 Elektronika B3-39
 Elektronika B3-54

"Elektronika C3" series 
C in "C3" stands for Svetlana (company) (Russian: Светлана).
 Elektronika С3-07
 Elektronika С3-15
 Elektronika С3-22
 Elektronika С3-27/C3-27A
 Elektronika С3-33

"Elektronika MK" series 
"MK" stands for "microcalculator" (Russian: микрокалькулятор).
 Elektronika MK-103
 Elektronika MK-104
 Elektronika MK-106
 Elektronika MK-107
 Elektronika MK-1103
 Elektronika MK-1104
 Elektronika MK-15
 Elektronika MK-18M
 Elektronika MK-22
 Elektronika MK-23/MK-23A
 Elektronika MK-33
 Elektronika MK-35
 Elektronika MK-36
 Elektronika MK-37/MK-37A/MK-37B
 Elektronika MK-38
 Elektronika MK-40
 Elektronika MK-41
 Elektronika MK-42
 Elektronika MK-44
 Elektronika MK-45
 Elektronika MK-46
 Elektronika MK-47
 Elektronika MK-51
 Elektronika MK-52
 Elektronika MK-53
 Elektronika MK-54
 Elektronika MK-56
 Elektronika MK-57/MK-57A/MK-57B/MK-57C
 Elektronika MK-59
 Elektronika MK-60/MK-60M
 Elektronika MK-61
 Elektronika MK-62
 Elektronika MK-64
 Elektronika MK-66
 Elektronika MK-68/68A
 Elektronika MK-69
 Elektronika MK-71
 Elektronika MK-77
 Elektronika MK-85/MK-85M/MK-85S
 Elektronika MK-87
 Elektronika MK-90
 Elektronika MK-91
 Elektronika MK-92
 Elektronika MK-93
 Elektronika MK-94/MK-94A
 Elektronika MK-95
 Elektronika MK-98
 Elektronika MK-PPV
 Elektronika MKSH-2/MKSH-2M
 Elektronika MKU-1

Calculators for kids 
 Detskaya Kassa
 Malysh

See also 
 Calculator
 Science and technology in the Soviet Union

References 

Calculators
Science and technology in the Soviet Union